Varkaus sub-region is a subdivision of Northern Savonia and one of the Sub-regions of Finland since 2009.

Municipalities
 Joroinen
 Leppävirta
 Varkaus

Politics
Results of the 2018 Finnish presidential election:

 Sauli Niinistö   67.9%
 Pekka Haavisto   7.6%
 Laura Huhtasaari  6.6%
 Paavo Väyrynen   6.5%
 Matti Vanhanen   4.4%
 Tuula Haatainen   3.8%
 Merja Kyllönen   3.0%
 Nils Torvalds   0.3%

Sub-regions of Finland
Geography of North Savo